Jeff Muncy is an American television producer and toy designer. In 2004, the animated series Pet Alien was created based upon Muncy's popular toy line and book of the same name. The series was picked up internationally by Cartoon Network. Muncy has since focused his career on creating and developing animated film and TV projects. He is the creator and executive producer on the series Pajanimals, which was produced by The Jim Henson Company and PBS Kids Sprout.

Muncy remains active in toy creation, as creator and co-founder of the Psyclops brand of collectible toys and accessories.

External links

Interview with Animation World News

Living people
Year of birth missing (living people)